Search and Destroy is a 1979 Canadian action-thriller film directed  by William Fruet and starring Perry King, Don Stroud, and Tisa Farrow.

Plot
Members of a Vietnam veteran's old Army unit start turning up dead in Los Angeles and Niagara Falls. Ex-Colonel Kip Moore (Perry King), is pressed by Upstate New York police for details. Meanwhile, a mysterious killer with a black glove is on the loose.

Cast 

 Perry King as  Kip Moore
 Don Stroud as Buddy Grant
 Tisa Farrow as Kate Barthel
 George Kennedy as Anthony Fusqua
 Jong Soo Park as Assassin
  Tony Sheer  as Frank Malone
  Phil Aikin  as Rosie Washington
  Rummy Bishop  as Ernie Cappel
  Daniel Buccos  as Sinclair
  Rob Garrison  as R.J.

Reception   
Really Awful Movies called it..."Great Canadian exploitation fun," while TV Guide said Search and Destroy was an "empty variation on the "let's win in Vietnam" theme that emerged in the years following the American defeat."

References

External links 

  

Canadian action thriller films
English-language Canadian films
1970s action thriller films
Films directed by William Fruet
Vietnam War films
1970s English-language films
1970s Canadian films